Lubieszów  is a village in the administrative district of Gmina Nowa Sól, within Nowa Sól County, Lubusz Voivodeship, in western Poland.

In 2008 the village had a population of 666.

References

Villages in Nowa Sól County